Chase Mills Inn was a historic inn and tavern building located at Chase Mills in St. Lawrence County, New York.  It was built about 1865 and is a two-story wood-sheathed structure with a principal three-bay mass and a two-story, two-bay wing.  It features a low hipped roof and two porches.

It was listed on the National Register of Historic Places in 1978. 

The Inn was torn down in 2005 and owned by George Michels who owned it since 1972. It was originally owned by Moses Small, Edward Creighton, Levi Abernathy, and Mary Lenny. Lenny sold it to Michels.

References

National Register of Historic Places in New York (state)
Hotels in New York (state)
Hotel buildings completed in 1865
Buildings and structures in St. Lawrence County, New York
National Register of Historic Places in St. Lawrence County, New York
Demolished buildings and structures in New York (state)
Buildings and structures demolished in 2005